Elizabeth M. Curtis (September 17, 1917 – April 17, 2002) was an American science fiction/fantasy writer.

She was born in Toledo, Ohio. She earned a BA and MA in English from Oberlin College. In 1966, she earned a MEd from Allegheny College.

Her first short story was published in The Magazine of Fantasy & Science Fiction in 1950. Her second story was published later that same year in Imagination. Her work appeared in various publications, including Amazing Stories, Analog Science Fiction and Fact, Authentic Science Fiction, Galaxy Science Fiction, If, Infinity Science Fiction and Marvel Science Stories,. In all, she is known to have published sixteen stories from 1950 through 1973. In 1969, she was nominated for a Hugo Award for Best Short Story for "The Steiger Effect". She never published a novel.

She was an active member of the Society for Creative Anachronism.

Curtis died at the age of 84.

Family
Curtis's daughter was editor Maggie Thompson.

References

External links
 

1917 births
2002 deaths
20th-century American women writers
American science fiction writers
Oberlin College alumni
Allegheny College alumni